Rudraprayag is a district of the state of Uttarakhand of northern India. The district occupies an area of 1984 km2. The town of Rudraprayag is the administrative headquarters of the district. The district is bounded by Uttarkashi District on the north, Chamoli District on the east, Pauri Garhwal District on the south, and Tehri Garhwal District on the west.

Overview
Rudraprayag District was established on 16 September 1997. It was carved out from the following areas of three adjoining districts:
 The whole of Augustmuni and Ukhimath block and part of Pokhri and Karnprayag block from Chamoli District
 Part of Jakholi and Kirtinagar block from Tehri District
 Part of Khirsu block from Pauri District

The internationally known Kedarnath Temple is at the north, Madmaheshwar at east, Nagrasu at southern east and Srinagar at extreme south. The Mandakini River is the main river of the district.

As of 2011 it is the least populous district of Uttarakhand (out of 13).

Demographics

According to the 2011 census Rudraprayag district has a population of 242,285, roughly equal to the nation of Vanuatu. This gives it a ranking of 583 in India (out of a total of 640). Its population growth rate over the decade 2001-2011 was 4.14%. Rudraprayag has a sex ratio of 1120 females for every 1000 males, making it the 6th highest in the country as per 2011 census, second being Almora that too in uttarakhand, and a literacy rate of 82.09%. Scheduled Castes and Scheduled Tribes make up 19.68% and 0.16% of the population respectively.

The predominant first language of the district is Garhwali, spoken by 94.48% of the population according to the 2011 census. Hindi, though widely used a lingua franca, is the first language of 4.20%, while 0.60% are speakers of Nepali.

Assembly constituencies
 Kedarnath
 Rudraprayag

Shrines and temples
 Kedarnath
 Tungnath
 Madhyamaheshwar
 Mathiyana Devi
 Kalimath Shakti Peeth

Cities, towns and villages in Rudraprayag district
 Rudraprayag
 Sumerpur
 Bawai - 20 km from Rudraprayag city via Maikoti-Durgadhar, and 18 km from Tilwada
 Maikoti
 Biron Dewal village
 Darmwari
 Benji Village
 Triyuginarayan village
 Guptakashi
 Gaurikund
 Jaggi Kandai village
 Bainji Kandai Dashjula village

See also
 Leopard of Rudraprayag

References

External links

 

 
Districts of Uttarakhand